Tebbetts is an English-language patronymic surname, a variant spelling of Tibbetts, from the given names Tebald or Tibalt. Notable people with the name include:

 Birdie Tebbetts (1912–1999), American baseball player, manager, scout, and front office executive
 Chris Tebbetts, American author
 George P. Tebbetts (1828–1909), American politician
 Jonas March Tebbetts (1820–1913), American politician
 Rufus B. Tebbetts (1829–?), American politician

See also 
 
 Tibbets

References 

English-language surnames
Patronymic surnames